Andalusian Nation (in Spanish: Nación Andaluza; NA) is an Andalusian nationalist, independentist and socialist political party in Andalusia (Spain). Its organ of expression is the magazine Independencia. NA is a founding member of the former coalition National Assembly of Andalucía, which the organization left in 2004.

Elections
 Andalusian parliamentary election, 1994: 9,690 votes (0.27%)
 Andalusian parliamentary election, 1996: 5,846 votes (0.14%)
 Spanish general election, 1996: 3,505 votes (0.08%)
 Andalusian regional election, 2018: 5,015 votes (0.14%)

References

External links
 Official website

1991 establishments in Spain
Andalusian nationalist parties
Anti-imperialist organizations
Left-wing nationalist parties
Political parties established in 1991
Political parties in Andalusia
Pro-independence parties
Socialist parties in Spain